Ryszard Wyrobek (17 May 1927 – 12 March 1996) was a Polish footballer. He played in two matches for the Poland national football team from 1954 to 1956.

References

External links
 

1927 births
1996 deaths
Polish footballers
Poland international footballers
Place of birth missing
Association footballers not categorized by position